The French IAE are part of the French universities, except for the IAE of Paris which has a special status. They are academically selective, socially inclusive and very affordable Graduate School of Management within the French Public Research Universities. The IAE model is inspired by American Business Schools.

There are currently 34 IAEs located across France, 32 of which are part of the IAE FRANCE network where the oldest members are the first actors in the development of management in France. This is the primary French network of education in management which has around 45,000 students and 425,000 alumni.

IAE's History

The origin of IAE dates back to the 1950s. At the time, degrees in management were not available in French universities. In the United States, by contrast, economic growth is powered by batches of engineers and managers from the best business schools attached to universities. In the midst of reconstruction, France have a lack of managers while the Thirty Glorious begin.

In 1955, Gaston Berger, Director of Higher Education, Ministry of Education, created the Institute of Business Administration (IAE) in American style, to provide academic knowledge in management that complements the professional know-how and gather University and Business world.
In the beginning, IAE were schools with a single diploma, “CAAE” - Certificate in Business Administration with a pioneering position on the "dual skills". This degree was designed to give management skills to engineers and graduate students of the faculties of Law, Letters and Sciences. Recognized degree, designed to be followed on a year, during the evening, is a “MBA à la française”. The teaching is based on the case method, innovative approach at the time. It has been for nearly 20 years, the common degree of most IAE in becoming “DESS CAAE” and continues today through the “MAE” (Master of Business Administration).

Academics 

The IAE network supports education in business administration and management at more than 30 business schools within public universities in France. Students may enroll in most IAE member Bachelors programs directly after a obtaining a Baccalauréat, or the equivalent high school diploma for international students, or in a Masters programs directly. Unlike the French Grandes écoles, public university education is open admissions, tuition is often more affordable, and registration does not require attendance at a Classe préparatoire aux grandes écoles or prépa (post-high school preparatory school). Some IAE degree programs require that applicants take an exam called the IAE Message Test (SIM) prior to admittance, but not all programs require this or any test score, although some programs are taught in English and may require additional test scores in English as a second language. The SIM exam covers these areas: general knowledge; economic and managerial culture; comprehension and written expression in French; logical and numerical reasoning; comprehension and written expression in English.

Many IAE business schools offers Bachelor, Master, and Doctoral programmes in many academic, business administration and management subjects. Higher education degrees in France are organized into three levels thus facilitating international mobility: the Licence / Bachelor's, Master's, and Doctorate degrees. A Bachelor's degree requires the completion of 180 ECTS credits; a Master's, requires an additional 120 ECTS credits. Degrees from French public universities are recognized world-wide and awarded by the Ministry of National Education (France). In 2022, annual tuition for many IAE Bachelors degree programs taught in English-only was €262, for students from anywhere in the world.

Partnerships 
IAE management schools have more than 1,400 university exchange partnerships in over 50 countries. Additionally, all IAE students may participate in university students exchanges in China and in Canada.

Sichuan International Studies University (SISU), Chongqing, China - Since 2016, IAE and SISU students have been able to take Master level programs in the English and French programs at both schools.
McGill University, Montreal, Canada - Since 2017, IAE students are able to transfer to McGill for one or two semesters.

IAE Business Schools 

Most members of the IAE network have the status of: institutes and schools belonging to universities. Within a university, some are schools, and others are part of a larger faculty, such as the faculty of economics and management. The IAE Paris is the only independent IAE, but it too is linked to Pantheon-Sorbonne University as an public establishment of an administrative nature. EM Strasbourg Business School is also different in that it is a Grande école, the result of the merger in 2008 between the public IAE Strasbourg (est.1956) and the Grande école IECS of Strasbourg (est.1919), within the University of Strasbourg.

Alumni
 Guillaume Faury : CEO of Airbus and Former CEO of Eurocopter
 Bérangère Couillard : Politician
 Pierre-Andre Terisse : Former COO/CFO of Coty Inc.
 Amandine Petit : Miss France 2021
 Sylvain Waserman : Politician
 Quentin Beriot : Directeur General Unéo
 Jean-Marc Zulesi : Politician
 Marie-Arlette Carlotti : Politician

References

External links
Official Website

 
Universities and colleges in France
Educational institutions established in 1955
1955 establishments in France